Amrita Lal Dey College is a college in the city of Barishal, Bangladesh. It was established by Amrita Lal Dey and opened on 22 April 1992. The college has approximately 2,500 students.

References

Colleges in Barisal District